The 2019–20 Sacramento Kings season was the 75th season of the franchise, its 71st season in the National Basketball Association (NBA), and its 35th in Sacramento.

The Kings entered the season with the current longest NBA playoff appearance drought at 13 seasons, last qualifying in 2006. Following a record of 39–43 the previous season, the Kings' head coach Dave Joerger was fired on April 12, 2019. Two days later, they hired former Lakers coach Luke Walton. The Kings hired former Suns head coach Igor Kokoškov as an assistant coach.

The season was suspended by the league officials following the games of March 11 after it was reported that Rudy Gobert had tested positive for COVID-19. On July 5, the NBA announced a return of the season which would involve 22 teams playing in the NBA Bubble at the ESPN Wide World of Sports Complex at the Walt Disney World Resort in Florida. Each of the remaining 22 teams would play eight seeding games to determine positioning for the NBA playoffs. The Kings resumed play on July 31. But a 129–112 loss to the Houston Rockets eliminated the Kings from playoff contention for a 14th season in a row, extending the third longest active drought among all four North American major professional sports leagues.

Draft picks

The Sacramento Kings hold no first round picks, but three second round picks. Their first round pick was traded to the Philadelphia 76ers in 2015 and the 76ers conditionally traded it to the Boston Celtics in the days entering the 2017 NBA Draft. The lottery selection the team had failed to reach the 1st pick, meaning the pick goes to the Boston Celtics. The 47th pick would be traded to the New York Knicks for Kyle Guy and cash considerations.

Roster

Standings

Division

Conference

Game log

Preseason 

|- style="background:#fcc;"
| 1
| October 4
| Indiana
| 
| Buddy Hield (28)
| Bagley III, Bjelica (5)
| De'Aaron Fox (8)
| NSCI Dome4,660
| 0–1
|- style="background:#fcc;"
| 2
| October 5
| @ Indiana
| 
| Buddy Hield (17)
| Dewayne Dedmon (7)
| De'Aaron Fox (6)
| NSCI Dome4,660
| 0–2
|- style="background:#cfc;"
| 3
| October 10
| Phoenix
| 
| De'Aaron Fox (18)
| Marvin Bagley III (13)
| De'Aaron Fox (6)
| Golden One Center15,385
| 1–2
|- style="background:#cfc;"
| 4
| October 14
| @ Utah
| 
| Buddy Hield (23)
| Marvin Bagley III (11)
| Bogdan Bogdanović (8)
| Vivint Smart Home Arena16,339
| 2–2
|- style="background:#cfc;"
| 5
| October 16
| Melbourne
| 
| Marvin Bagley III (30)
| Marvin Bagley III (14)
| Ferrell, Hield (6)
| Golden One Center10,534
| 3–2

|- style="background:#fcc;"
| 1
| July 22
| @ Miami
| 
| Buddy Hield (19)
| Harry Giles III (7)
| Yogi Ferrell (7)
| HP Field House
| 0–1
|- style="background:#fcc;"
| 2
| July 25
| Milwaukee
| 
| Buddy Hield (19)
| Kent Bazemore (8)
| De'Aaron Fox (6)
| The Arena
| 0–2
|- style="background:#cfc;"
| 3
| July 27
| @ L. A. Clippers
| 
| Bogdan Bogdanović (21)
| Harry Giles III (9)
| De'Aaron Fox (6)
| The Arena
| 1–2

Regular season 

|- style="background:#fcc;"
| 1
| October 23
| @ Phoenix
| 
| Buddy Hield (28)
| Marvin Bagley III (10)
| De'Aaron Fox (5)
| Talking Stick Resort Arena18,055
| 0–1
|- style="background:#fcc;"
| 2
| October 25
| Portland
| 
| De'Aaron Fox (28)
| Dewayne Dedmon (8)
| De'Aaron Fox (5)
| Golden 1 Center17,583
| 0–2
|- style="background:#fcc;"
| 3
| October 26
| @ Utah
| 
| Dewayne Dedmon (11)
| Dewayne Dedmon (6)
| De'Aaron Fox (5)
| Vivint Smart Home Arena18,306
| 0–3
|- style="background:#fcc;"
| 4
| October 28
| Denver
| 
| Richaun Holmes (24)
| Richaun Holmes (12)
| De'Aaron Fox (9)
| Golden 1 Center15,870
| 0–4
|- style="background:#fcc;"
| 5
| October 30
| Charlotte
| 
| Buddy Hield (23)
| Richaun Holmes (9)
| De'Aaron Fox (10)
| Golden 1 Center15,416
| 0–5

|- style="background:#cfc;"
| 6
| November 1
| Utah
| 
| De'Aaron Fox (25)
| Dewayne Dedmon (7)
| De'Aaron Fox (4)
| Golden 1 Center16,273
| 1–5
|- style="background:#cfc;"
| 7
| November 3
| @ New York
| 
| De'Aaron Fox (24)
| Richaun Holmes (10)
| Fox, Bjelica (6)
| Madison Square Garden19,812
| 2–5
|- style="background:#fcc;"
| 8
| November 6
| @ Toronto
| 
| Harrison Barnes (26)
| Bjelica, Holmes, Hield (8)
| De'Aaron Fox (9)
| Scotiabank Arena19,800
| 2–6
|- style="background:#cfc;"
| 9
| November 8
| @ Atlanta
| 
| Buddy Hield (22)
| Richaun Holmes (9)
| De'Aaron Fox (9)
| State Farm Arena16,447
| 3–6
|- style="background:#cfc;"
| 10
| November 12
| Portland
| 
| Bogdan Bogdanovic (25)
| Nemanja Bjelica (12)
| Bogdan Bogdanovic (10)
| Golden 1 Center16,358
| 4–6
|- style="background:#fcc;"
| 11
| November 15
| @ L. A. Lakers
| 
| Buddy Hield (21)
| Barnes, Holmes, Hield (8)
| Harrison Barnes (6)
| Staples Center18,997
| 4–7
|- style="background:#cfc;"
| 12
| November 17
| Boston
| 
| Buddy Hield (35)
| Nemanja Bjelica (14)
| Bogdan Bogdanovic (10)
| Golden 1 Center16,633
| 5–7
|- style="background:#cfc;"
| 13
| November 19
| Phoenix
| 
| Bogdan Bogdanovic (31)
| Richaun Holmes (15)
| Cory Joseph (14)
| Golden 1 Center16,732
| 6–7
|- style="background:#fcc;"
| 14
| November 22
| @ Brooklyn
| 
| Harrison Barnes (18)
| Richaun Holmes (8)
| Joseph, Hield (5)
| Barclays Center15,619
| 6–8
|- style="background:#cfc;"
| 15
| November 24
| @ Washington
| 
| Harrison Barnes (26)
| Nemanja Bjelica (12)
| Joseph, Hield (5)
| Capital One Arena15,885
| 7–8
|- style="background:#fcc;"
| 16
| November 25
| @ Boston
| 
| Buddy Hield (41)
| Nemanja Bjelica (6)
| Bogdan Bogdanovic (8)
| TD Garden19,156
| 7–9
|- style="background:#fcc;"
| 17
| November 27
| @ Philadelphia
| 
| Buddy Hield (22)
| Harrison Barnes (9)
| Harrison Barnes (6)
| Wells Fargo Center20,592
| 7–10
|- style="background:#cfc;"
| 18
| November 30
| Denver
| 
| Harrison Barnes (30)
| Nemanja Bjelica (12)
| Bjelica, Bogdanovic (5)
| Golden 1 Center17,583
| 8–10

|- style="background:#fcc;"
| 19
| December 2
| Chicago
| 
| Buddy Hield (26)
| Richaun Holmes (9)
| Cory Joseph (7)
| Golden 1 Center17,257
| 8–11
|- style="background:#fcc;"
| 20
| December 4
| @ Portland
| 
| Richaun Holmes (28)
| Richaun Holmes (10)
| Joseph, Hield (7)
| Moda Center19,393
| 8–12
|- style="background:#fcc;"
| 21
| December 6
| @ San Antonio
| 
| Buddy Hield (23)
| Richaun Holmes (14)
| Barnes, Holmes (5)
| AT&T Center18,354
| 8–13
|- style="background:#cfc;"
| 22
| December 8
| @ Dallas
| 
| Nemanja Bjelica (30)
| Richaun Holmes (9)
| Barnes, Hield (5)
| American Airlines Center19,566
| 9–13
|- style="background:#cfc;"
| 23
| December 9
| @ Houston
| 
| Buddy Hield (26)
| Barnes, Holmes (8)
| Trevor Ariza (7)
| Toyota Center18,055
| 10–13
|- style="background:#cfc;"
| 24
| December 11
| Oklahoma City
| 
| Buddy Hield (23)
| Richaun Holmes (7)
| Buddy Hield (6)
| Golden 1 Center16,723
| 11–13
|- style="background:#fcc;"
| 25
| December 13
| New York
| 
| Buddy Hield (34)
| Buddy Hield (12)
| Nemanja Bjelica (7)
| Golden 1 Center17,583
| 11–14
|- style="background:#cfc;"
| 26
| December 15
| @ Golden State
| 
| Bogdan Bogdanović (25)
| Marvin Bagley III (6)
| Joseph, Bogdanović (5)
| Chase Center18,064
| 12–14
|- style="background:#fcc;"
| 27
| December 17
| @ Charlotte
| 
| De'Aaron Fox (19)
| Marvin Bagley III (7)
| De'Aaron Fox (8)
| Spectrum Center13,229
| 12–15
|- style="background:#fcc;"
| 28
| December 20
| @ Indiana
| 
| Richaun Holmes (20)
| Richaun Holmes (9)
| Fox, Hield (6)
| Bankers Life Fieldhouse14,649
| 12–16
|- style="background:#fcc;"
| 29
| December 21
| @ Memphis
| 
| Harrison Barnes (25)
| Richaun Holmes (12)
| Joseph, Barnes (5)
| FedExForum15,603
| 12–17
|- style="background:#fcc;"
| 30
| December 23
| Houston
| 
| De'Aaron Fox (31)
| Richaun Holmes (13)
| De'Aaron Fox (6)
| Golden 1 Center17,583
| 12–18
|- style="background:#fcc;"
| 31
| December 26
| Minnesota
| 
| Richaun Holmes (20)
| Richaun Holmes (18)
| Cory Joseph (7)
| Golden 1 Center17,583
| 12–19
|- style="background:#fcc;"
| 32
| December 28
| Phoenix
| 
| Buddy Hield (23)
| Harrison Barnes (10)
| Cory Joseph (5)
| Golden 1 Center17,583
| 12–20
|- style="background:#fcc;"
| 33
| December 29
| @ Denver
| 
| Nemanja Bjelica (27)
| Bjelica, Holmes (6)
| De'Aaron Fox (13)
| Pepsi Center19,520
| 12–21
|- style="background:#fcc;"
| 34
| December 31
| L. A. Clippers
| 
| Richaun Holmes (22)
| Richaun Holmes (10)
| De'Aaron Fox (6)
| Golden 1 Center16,231
| 12–22

|- style="background:#cfc;"
| 35
| January 2
| Memphis
| 
| De'Aaron Fox (27)
| Trevor Ariza (8)
| De'Aaron Fox (9)
| Golden 1 Center17,351
| 13–22
|- style="background:#fcc;"
| 36
| January 4
| New Orleans
| 
| Harrison Barnes (30)
| Holmes, Hield (12)
| Joseph, Fox (5)
| Golden 1 Center16,808
| 13–23
|- style="background:#cfc;"
| 37
| January 6
| Golden State
| 
| Hield, Fox (21)
| Nemanja Bjelica (10)
| De'Aaron Fox (7)
| Golden 1 Center15,819
| 14–23
|- style="background:#cfc;"
| 38
| January 7
| @ Phoenix
| 
| De'Aaron Fox (27)
| Dewayne Dedmon (10)
| De'Aaron Fox (6)
| Talking Stick Resort Arena14,134
| 15–23
|- style="background:#fcc;"
| 39
| January 10
| Milwaukee
| 
| Barnes, Fox (19)
| Nemanja Bjelica (13)
| De'Aaron Fox (10)
| Golden 1 Center17,583
| 15–24
|- style="background:#fcc;"
| 40
| January 13
| Orlando
| 
| Nemanja Bjelica (34)
| De'Aaron Fox (8)
| De'Aaron Fox (10)
| Golden 1 Center16,299
| 15–25
|- style="background:#fcc;"
| 41
| January 15
| Dallas
| 
| De'Aaron Fox (27)
| Nemanja Bjelica (12)
| De'Aaron Fox (12)
| Golden 1 Center17,029
| 15–26
|- style="background:#fcc;"
| 42
| January 18
| @ Utah
| 
| De'Aaron Fox (21)
| Marvin Bagley III (7)
| De'Aaron Fox (8)
| Vivint Smart Home Arena18,306
| 15–27
|- style="background:#fcc;"
| 43
| January 20
| @ Miami
| 
| Nemanja Bjelica (22)
| Marvin Bagley III (15)
| De'Aaron Fox (8)
| American Airlines Arena19,600
| 15–28
|- style="background:#fcc;"
| 44
| January 22
| @ Detroit
| 
| De'Aaron Fox (22)
| Dewayne Dedmon (10)
| Bjelica, Hield (5)
| Little Caesars Arena13,972
| 15–29
|- style="background:#cfc;"
| 45
| January 24
| @ Chicago
| 
| Buddy Hield (21)
| Buddy Hield (8)
| De'Aaron Fox (7)
| United Center17,661
| 16–29
|- style="background:#cfc;"
| 46
| January 27
| @ Minnesota
| 
| Buddy Hield (42)
| Nemanja Bjelica (9)
| Bjelica, Fox (8)
| Target Center13,449
| 17–29
|- style="background:#fcc;"
| 47
| January 29
| Oklahoma City
| 
| Bogdan Bogdanović (23)
| Dewayne Dedmon (7)
| Bjelica, Fox (5)
| Golden 1 Center16,935
| 17–30
|- style="background:#cfc;"
| 48
| January 30
| @ L. A. Clippers
| 
| De'Aaron Fox (34)
| Dewayne Dedmon (11)
| De'Aaron Fox (8)
| Staples Center19,068
| 18–30

|- style="background:#fcc;"
| 49
| February 1
| L. A. Lakers
| 
| De'Aaron Fox (24)
| Harry Giles (8)
| Fox, Joseph (5)
| Golden 1 Center17,583
| 18–31
|- style="background:#cfc;"
| 50
| February 3
| Minnesota
| 
| De'Aaron Fox (31)
| Dewayne Dedmon (12)
| Harrison Barnes (7)
| Golden 1 Center15,819
| 19–31
|- style="background:#cfc;"
| 51
| February 7
| Miami
| 
| Bogdan Bogdanović (23)
| Buddy Hield (7)
| Bjelica, Fox (8)
| Golden 1 Center16,760
| 20–31
|- style="background:#cfc;"
| 52
| February 8
| San Antonio
| 
| Buddy Hield (31)
| Harry Giles (12)
| Fox, Hield (5)
| Golden 1 Center16,756
| 21–31
|- style="background:#fcc;"
| 53
| February 10
| @ Milwaukee
| 
| Harrison Barnes (23)
| Bjelica, Fox (8)
| De'Aaron Fox (11)
| Fiserv Forum17,463
| 21–32
|- style="background:#fcc;"
| 54
| February 12
| @ Dallas
| 
| Buddy Hield (22)
| Barnes, Bazemore, Bjelica (7)
| Buddy Hield (9)
| American Airlines Center19,842
| 21–33
|- style="background:#cfc;"
| 55
| February 20
| Memphis
| 
| Harrison Barnes (32)
| Nemanja Bjelica (6)
| Nemanja Bjelica (5)
| Golden 1 Center17,078
| 22–33
|- style="background:#cfc;"
| 56
| February 22
| @ L. A. Clippers
| 
| Kent Bazemore (23)
| Harry Giles (12)
| De'Aaron Fox (8)
| Staples Center19,068
| 23–33
|- style="background:#cfc;"
| 57
| February 25
| @ Golden State
| 
| Barnes, Fox (21)
| Kent Bazemore (10)
| Bjelica, Fox (5)
| Chase Center18,064
| 24–33
|- style="background:#fcc;"
| 58
| February 27
| @ Oklahoma City
| 
| Harrison Barnes (21)
| Alex Len (11)
| Cory Joseph (11)
| Chesapeake Energy Arena18,203
| 24–34
|- style="background:#cfc;"
| 59
| February 28
| @ Memphis
| 
| De'Aaron Fox (25)
| Nemanja Bjelica (11)
| De'Aaron Fox (5)
| FedExForum17,794
| 25–34

|- style="background:#cfc;"
| 60
| March 1
| Detroit
| 
| De'Aaron Fox (23)
| Alex Len (13)
| De'Aaron Fox (7)
| Golden 1 Center17,499
| 26–34
|- style="background:#cfc;"
| 61
| March 3
| Washington
| 
| De'Aaron Fox (31)
| Nemanja Bjelica (7)
| 5 players (4)
| Golden 1 Center16,419
| 27–34
|- style="background:#fcc;"
| 62
| March 5
| Philadelphia
| 
| De'Aaron Fox (23)
| Kent Bazemore (9)
| De'Aaron Fox (7)
| Golden 1 Center15,485
| 27–35
|- style="background:#cfc;"
| 63
| March 7
| @ Portland
| 
| Bogdan Bogdanović (27)
| Richaun Holmes (8)
| De'Aaron Fox (11)
| Moda Center19,691
| 28–35
|- style="background:#fcc;"
| 64
| March 8
| Toronto
| 
| De'Aaron Fox (28)
| Nemanja Bjelica (10)
| Cory Joseph (6)
| Golden 1 Center16,449
| 28–36

|- style="background:#fcc;"
| 65
| July 31
| @ San Antonio
|
| De'Aaron Fox (39)
| Kent Bazemore (11)
| De'Aaron Fox (6)
| Visa Athletic CenterNo In-Person Attendance
|28–37
|- style="background:#fcc;"
| 66
| August 2
| @ Orlando
| 
| Harry Giles (23)
| Harry Giles (8)
| Cory Joseph (6)
| HP Field HouseNo In-Person Attendance
| 28–38
|- style="background:#fcc;"
| 67
| August 4
| Dallas
| 
| De'Aaron Fox (28)
| Nemanja Bjelica (13)
| De'Aaron Fox (9)
| HP Field HouseNo In-Person Attendance
| 28–39
|- style="background:#cfc;"
| 68
| August 6
| New Orleans
| 
| Bogdan Bogdanović (35)
| Barnes, Len (6)
| De'Aaron Fox (10)
| HP Field HouseNo In-Person Attendance
| 29–39
|- style="background:#fcc;"
| 69
| August 7
| @ Brooklyn
| 
| Bogdan Bogdanović (27)
| Alex Len (11)
| De'Aaron Fox (7)
| The ArenaNo In-Person Attendance
| 29–40
|- style="background:#fcc;"
| 70
| August 9
| Houston
| 
| De'Aaron Fox (26)
| Harrison Barnes (10)
| De'Aaron Fox (9) 
| HP Field HouseNo In-Person Attendance
| 29–41
|- style="background:#cfc;"
| 71
| August 11
| New Orleans
| 
| Harrison Barnes (25)
| Harry Giles (11)
| Bogdan Bogdanović (7)
| The ArenaNo In-Person Attendance
| 30–41
|- style="background:#cfc;"
| 72
| August 13
| @ L. A. Lakers
| 
| Buddy Hield (28)
| Bjelica, Parker (8)
| Nemanja Bjelica (13)
| HP Field HouseNo In-Person Attendance
| 31–41

|- style="background:#;"
| 65
| March 11
| New Orleans
| 
| 
| 
| 
| Golden 1 Center
| 
|- style="background:#;"
| 66
| March 15
| Brooklyn
| 
| 
| 
| 
| Golden 1 Center
| 
|- style="background:#;"
| 67
| March 17
| Dallas
| 
| 
| 
| 
| Golden 1 Center
| 
|- style="background:#;"
| 68
| March 19
| @ Houston
| 
| 
| 
| 
| Toyota Center
| 
|- style="background:#;"
| 69
| March 21
| @ Orlando
| 
| 
| 
| 
| Amway Center
| 
|- style="background:#;"
| 70
| March 22
| @ New Orleans
| 
| 
| 
| 
| Smoothie King Center
| 
|- style="background:#;"
| 71
| March 24
| @ Cleveland
| 
| 
| 
| 
| Rocket Mortgage FieldHouse
| 
|- style="background:#;"
| 72
| March 26
| Atlanta
| 
| 
| 
| 
| Golden 1 Center
| 
|- style="background:#;"
| 73
| March 29
| Indiana
| 
| 
| 
| 
| Golden 1 Center
| 
|- style="background:#;"
| 74
| March 31
| San Antonio
| 
| 
| 
| 
| Golden 1 Center
| 
|- style="background:#;"
| 75
| April 2
| LA Clippers
| 
| 
| 
| 
| Golden 1 Center
| 
|- style="background:#;"
| 76
| April 4
| LA Lakers
| 
| 
| 
| 
| Golden 1 Center
| 
|- style="background:#;"
| 77
| April 5
| Cleveland
| 
| 
| 
| 
| Golden 1 Center
| 
|- style="background:#;"
| 78
| April 7
| @ San Antonio
| 
| 
| 
| 
| AT&T Center
| 
|- style="background:#;"
| 79
| April 9
| @ Minnesota
| 
| 
| 
| 
| Target Center
| 
|- style="background:#;"
| 80
| April 11
| @ Denver
| 
| 
| 
| 
| Pepsi Center
| 
|- style="background:#;"
| 81
| April 14
| @ LA Lakers
| 
| 
| 
| 
| Staples Center
| 
|- style="background:#;"
| 82
| April 15
| Golden State
| 
| 
| 
| 
| Golden 1 Center
|

Transactions

Trades

Free agency

Additions

Subtractions

References

Sacramento Kings seasons
Sacramento Kings
Sacramento Kings
Sacramento Kings